Lazanki (singular łazanka) is a Belarusian, Lithuanian and Polish type of pasta. It consists of wheat, rye or buckwheat kneaded into dough which is rolled thin and cut into triangles or rectangles. These are boiled, drained, and eaten with melted pork fat, vegetable oil and often sour cream. In Poland, they are commonly mixed with fried cabbage or with soured cabbage and small pieces of sausage, meat and/or mushrooms.

History
Lazanki arrived in the Polish–Lithuanian Commonwealth in the mid-16th century when Bona Sforza, Italian wife of King Sigismund I the Old, brought high Italian cuisine to the country. Accordingly, the name łazanki/лазанкі is reminiscent of the Italian lasagne, the name for a type of pasta in the shape of large, flat rectangles. Lazanki resembling mini versions of lasagne, their Polish and Belarusian names are correspondingly diminutive in form ("little lasagne"). Unlike most Italian dishes in these parts of Europe, lazanki have survived into the 21st century, although the long and cultural history of the dish has been largely forgotten.

See also
 Crozets de Savoie
 Hilopites

 List of buckwheat dishes
 List of pasta
 List of pasta dishes

References

Belarusian cuisine
Ukrainian cuisine
Polish cuisine
Lithuanian cuisine